Psychology of Women Quarterly is a quarterly peer-reviewed academic journal that covers the fields of psychology and women's studies, focusing on the psychological health of women. The journal's editor is Dawn M. Szymanski, PhD (University of Tennessee, Knoxville, TN, United States). It was established in 1976 and is published by SAGE Publications on behalf of the Society for the Psychology of Women, a division of the American Psychological Association.

Abstracting and indexing
The journal is abstracted and indexed in:

According to the Journal Citation Reports, the journal has a 2017 impact factor of 2.973, ranking it 1st out of 42 journals in the category "Women's Studies" and 23rd out of 135 journals in the category "Psychology, Multidisciplinary".

References

External links

Society for the Psychology of Women

English-language journals
Psychology journals
Publications established in 1976
Quarterly journals
SAGE Publishing academic journals
Women's health
Women's studies journals
Women and psychology